Elizabeth Moceiwai (born 1976) is a Fijian international female lawn bowler.

Biography
Moceiwai won a triples bronze medal with Litia Tikoisuva and Sheral Mar at the 2015 Asia Pacific Bowls Championships in New Zealand.

In 2016 she was selected to compete in the 2016 World Outdoor Bowls Championship and four years later in 2020 she was selected for the 2020 World Outdoor Bowls Championship in Australia. Previously she had competed at the 2014 Commonwealth Games.

References

Living people
1976 births
Fijian female bowls players
Bowls players at the 2014 Commonwealth Games
Commonwealth Games competitors for Fiji
Sportspeople from Suva